Andrena sphaeralceae, the globemallow andrena, is a species of mining bee in the family Andrenidae. It is found in Central America and North America.

References

Further reading

 
 

sphaeralceae
Articles created by Qbugbot
Insects described in 1939